Jackie Chan (born 1954) is a Hong Kong actor.

Jackie or Jack Chan may also refer to:

Jackie Chan (politician) (born 1938), former member of the Legislative Council of Hong Kong.
Jackie Chan Hiu-ki (born 1986), better known as Kellyjackie, Hong Kong pop singer
Jack Chan, character played by Johnny Ngan
"Jackie Chan" (song), by Tiësto and Dzeko ft. Preme and Post Malone

See also

Jacqui Chan
John Chan (disambiguation)